The R204 road, also called the Ballinamore–Carrigallen Road, is a regional road in Ireland, located in County Leitrim.

References

Regional roads in the Republic of Ireland
Roads in County Leitrim